Zacharias Kopystensky (born in Przemyśl town in Poland - died 21 March 1627) was archimandrite of the Kyiv Pechersk Lavra in Ukraine. He is best known for his polemic work Palinode, in which he defended Eastern Orthodoxy against the Uniates. He also translated the Horologion and the works of John Chrysostom.

Kopystensky studied at the Ostroh Academy. During his lifetime, Kyiv was part of the Polish–Lithuanian Commonwealth, and Kopystensky belonged to a circle of Orthodox clerics who promoted ideas of national liberation and cultural self-preservation. He is the likely author of the Hustyn Chronicle, which traces the history of Ukraine up to 1598. He succeeded Yelisey Pletenetsky as archimandrite in 1624.

Kopystensky rediscovered the Hypatian Codex in 1617 and took it to Kyiv to be copied by monks.

References

1627 deaths
Archimandrites
17th-century Eastern Orthodox clergy
Translators to Ukrainian